Melvin A. Halsted House is a historic home located at Lowell, Lake County, Indiana.  It was built in 1850, and is a two-story, five bay, Federal style brick dwelling with a gable roof.  It has a rear lean-to addition.  It was the home of a founder of Lowell and Melvin A. Halsted resided there until 1905.

It was listed in the National Register of Historic Places in 1978.

References

Houses on the National Register of Historic Places in Indiana
Federal architecture in Indiana
Houses completed in 1850
Buildings and structures in Lake County, Indiana
National Register of Historic Places in Lake County, Indiana
1850 establishments in Indiana